Cyber-utopianism or web-utopianism or digital utopianism or utopian internet is a subcategory of technological utopianism and the belief that online communication helps bring about a more decentralized, democratic, and libertarian society. The desired values may also be privacy and anonymity, freedom of expression, access to culture and information or also socialist ideals leading to digital socialism.

Cyber-populists like the M5S use the wonder associated with digital technologies aka the digital sublime to develop their political vision.

Origins
The Californian Ideology is a set of beliefs combining bohemian and anti-authoritarian attitudes from the counterculture of the 1960s with techno-utopianism and support for neoliberal economic policies. These beliefs are thought by some to have been characteristic of the culture of the IT industry in Silicon Valley and the West Coast of the United States during the dot-com boom of the 1990s. Adam Curtis connects it to Ayn Rand's Objectivist philosophy. Such an ideology of digital utopianism fueled the first generation of Internet pioneers.

Examples

Political usage
One of the first initiatives associated with digital technologies and utopianism was the Chilean Project Cybersyn. Project Cybersyn was an attempt of algorithmic governance for implementation of socialist ideals. The book Towards a New Socialism argues against the perception of digital socialism as a utopia. Digital socialism can be categorized as a real utopian project.

Cyber socialism is a name used for the practise of file sharing as a violation of intellectual property rights and whose legalisation was not expected - a utopia.

Cyber-utopianism serves as a base for cyber-populism. Electronic democracy as suggested and practised by Pirate Parties is being seen to be an idea motivated by cyber-utopianism. In Italy, the Five Star Movement extensively uses cyber-utopian rhetoric, promising direct democracy and better environmental regulations through the Web.

Cognate utopias
Cyber-utopianism has been considered a derivative of Extropianism, in which the ultimate goal is to upload human consciousness to the internet. Ray Kurzweil, especially in The Age of Spiritual Machines, writes about a form of cyber-utopianism known as the Singularity; wherein, technological advancement will be so rapid that life will become experientially different, incomprehensible, and advanced.

Hospitality exchange services
Hospitality exchange services (HospEx) are social networking services where hosts offer homestays for free.  They are a gift economy and are shaped by altruism and are examples of cyber-utopianism.

Criticism 
The existence of this belief has been documented since the beginning of the internet. The bursting of the dot-com bubble diminished the majority-utopian views of cyberspace; however, modern day "cyber skeptics" continue to exist. They believe in the idea that internet censorship and cyber sovereignty allows repressive governments to adapt their tactics to respond to threats by using technology against dissenting movements. Douglas Rushkoff notes that, "ideas, information, and applications now launching on Web sites around the world capitalise on the transparency, usability, and accessibility that the internet was born to deliver". In 2011, Evgeny Morozov, in his 2011 book The Net Delusion: The Dark Side of Internet Freedom, critiqued the role of cyber-utopianism in global politics; stating that the belief is naïve and stubborn, enabling the opportunity for authoritarian control and monitoring. Morozov notes that "former hippies", in the 1990s, are responsible for causing this misplaced utopian belief: "Cyber-utopians ambitiously set out to build a new and improved United Nations, only to end up with a digital Cirque du Soleil".

Criticism in the past couple of decades has been made out against positivist readings of the internet. In 2010, Malcolm Gladwell, argued his doubts about the emancipatory and empowering qualities of social media in an article in The New Yorker. In the article, Gladwell criticises Clay Shirky for propagating and overestimating the revolutionary potential of social media: "Shirky considers this model of activism an upgrade. But it is simply a form of organizing which favors the weak-tie connections that give us access to information over the strong-tie connections that help us persevere in the face of danger."

Cyber-utopianism has also been compared to a secular religion for the postmodern world and, in 2006, Andrew Keen wrote that Web 2.0 is a "grand utopian movement" similar to "communist society" as described by Karl Marx.

See also

References

Further reading
 Dickel, Sascha, and Schrape, Jan-Felix (2017): The Logic of Digital Utopianism. Nano Ethics
 Margaret Wertheim, The Pearly Gates of Cyberspace (2000)
 Evgeny Morozov, To Save Everything, Click Here (2013)
 Turner, Fred. From counterculture to cyberculture: Stewart Brand, the Whole Earth Network, and the rise of digital utopianism. University Of Chicago Press, 2010.
 Flichy, Patrice. The internet imaginaire. Mit Press, 2007.

External links
 Utopian Promises – Net Realities

Cyberspace
Social theories
Technological utopianism